The Gun Packer is a 1919 American short silent Western film directed by John Ford. Filming began on March 25, 1919, under the working title Out Wyoming Way. Just two months later, The Gun Packer was released by Universal Studios as a 20-minute silent film on two reels. This film was reissued in August 1924.

Plot
A reformed outlaw enlists the aid of his former gunslinging companions to defend a small shepherd community from domineering cattle barons.

Cast
 Ed Jones as Sandy McLoughlin
 Pete Morrison as "Pearl Handle" Wiley
 Magda Lane as Rose McLoughlin
 Jack Woods as Pecos Smith
 Hoot Gibson as Gang Leader
 Jack Walters as Brown
 Duke R. Lee as Buck Landers
 Howard Enstaedt as Bobby McLoughlin

See also
 John Ford filmography
 Hoot Gibson filmography

References

External links
 

1919 films
1919 short films
American silent short films
American black-and-white films
1919 Western (genre) films
Films directed by John Ford
Silent American Western (genre) films
1910s American films
1910s English-language films